Taleh Jerd is a village in Zanjan Province, Iran.

Taleh Jerd or Telehjerd or Talah Jerd or Talehjerd or Talegerd  may also refer to:
 Taleh Jerd-e Olya, Hamadan Province
 Taleh Jerd-e Sofla, Hamadan Province